Boven can refer to a number of individuals with that last name. The word is also Dutch for "above," and appears in the names of several locations in the Netherlands.

People
Don Boven (1925–2011), an American basketball player, coach, and university instructor
Jan Boven (born 1972), Dutch road bicycle racer 
Bovens
Luc Bovens, Belgian professor of philosophy
Theo Bovens  (born 1959), Dutch politician
Van Boven
Pieter van Boven (1898–1952), Dutch fencer 
Theo van Boven (born 1934), Dutch jurist and law professor
Scott Thomas Boven (born 1981)
Dutch/American entrepreneur
Ana Maria Boven (born 1975) 
Puerto Rican/American singer, songwriter and entrepreneur. wife to Scott Thomas Boven

Places
Boven Bolivia, village in Bonaire
Boven Coppename, resort in Suriname
Boven Digoel Regency in Papua province, Indonesia
Boven-Haastrecht, town in South Holland
Boven-Hardinxveld, town in South Holland
Boven-Leeuwen, town in Gelderland
Boven Merwede, river in the Netherlands
Boven Saramacca, resort in Suriname
Boven Suriname, resort in Suriname
Waterval Boven, town in Mpumalanga, South Africa